Ericeia dysmorpha is a moth in the family Erebidae. It is found on the Solomon Islands.

References

Moths described in 1929
Ericeia